Auxilium Convent School is a group of private English-medium convent schools located at various regions across India. This school is affiliated to Council for the Indian School Certificate Examinations. The school was established in 1960. This is a Catholic Educational Institution governed by the Salesian Sisters. Auxilium Convent has schools all over India including Maharashtra and Goa. They were founded by Saint Maria Ṃazzarello in 1872 to work alongside Saint John Bosco in his teaching projects in Turin and continue to be a teaching order worldwide. The School admits all children irrespective of caste and creed.

The Salesian Sisters of St John Bosco are the sister order of the Salesians of Don Bosco. They were founded by Saint Maria Mazzarello in 1872 to work alongside Saint John Bosco in his teaching projects in Turin and continue to be a teaching order worldwide.

References 

Salesian schools
Catholic schools in India
Christian schools in West Bengal
Schools in Kolkata
Schools in North 24 Parganas district
Educational institutions established in 1960
1960 establishments in West Bengal